Olearia cydoniifolia is a species of flowering plant in the family Asteraceae and is endemic to eastern Australia. It is a shrub with scattered elliptic leaves, and white and yellow, daisy-like inflorescences.

Description
The upper surface of the leaves is glabrous but the lower surface is covered with felt-like, silvery hairs. Each head has six to ten white ray florets surrounding thirteen to seventeen yellow disc florets. Flowering occurs in October and November and the fruit is a silky-hairy achene, the pappus with 40 to 44 bristles in two rows.

Taxonomy
This daisy bush was first formally described in 1836 by Augustin Pyramus de Candolle who gave it the name Eurybia cydoniifolia in his Prodromus Systematis Naturalis Regni Vegetabilis. In 1867 George Bentham changed that name to Olearia cydoniifolia in Flora Australiensis.

Distribution and habitat
Olearia cydoniifolia grows in forest and on the edges of dry rainforest mainly on the est of the Great Dividing Range between the Apsley River and Guyra in New South Wales and in south-eastern Queensland.

References

cydoniifolia
Flora of Queensland
Flora of New South Wales
Taxa named by Augustin Pyramus de Candolle
Plants described in 1836